Bairampur is a village in Mirzapur district, Uttar Pradesh, India. It is near Aharaura, in the vicinity of the ancient fort of Chunar

Villages in Mirzapur district